St Benedict's School may refer to:

St Benedict's School, Ealing, an independent school in Ealing, London, England
St Benedict's Catholic High School, Alcester, a secondary school in Alcester, Warwickshire, England
St Benedict's Catholic High School, Hensingham, a secondary school in Hensingham, Cumbria, England
St. Benedict's Catholic School, a National Registered Historic Place in Roundup, Montana, United States
St. Benedict High School (Chicago, Illinois), a private school in Chicago, Illinois, United States
Saint Benedict's Preparatory School, an all-boys Roman Catholic high school in New Jersey, United States
St Benedict's RC High School a secondary school in Linwood, Scotland
St Benedict's Catholic School a secondary school in Bury St Edmunds, Suffolk, England
St Benedict's Catholic College, a secondary school in Colchester, Essex, England

See also
St. Benedict's (disambiguation)